The 2010 Aegon Championships (also known traditionally as the Queen's Club Championships) was a tennis tournament played on outdoor grass courts. It was the 108Th edition of the Aegon Championships and was part of the ATP World Tour 250 series of the 2010 ATP World Tour. It took place at the Queen's Club in London, United Kingdom, from 7 to 13 June 2010. The field was headlined by the 2008 champion and current world number one Rafael Nadal, Novak Djokovic, Andy Roddick and defending champion Andy Murray.

Finals

Singles

 Sam Querrey defeated  Mardy Fish 7–6(7–3), 7–5
It was Querrey's third title of the year and 5th of his career. He won a title on all three surfaces during 2010 with the championship.

Doubles

 Novak Djokovic /  Jonathan Erlich defeated  Karol Beck /  David Škoch 7–6(8–6), 2–6, [10–3]

Entries

Seeds

 1 Seedings are based on the rankings of 24 May 2010.

Other entrants
The following players received wildcards into the singles main draw:
  Jamie Baker
  Grigor Dimitrov
  Ryan Harrison
  Bernard Tomic
  James Ward

The following players received entry from the qualifying draw:
  Alex Bogdanovic
  Frank Dancevic
  Nicolas Mahut
  Dmitry Tursunov

References

External links
 Official website Aegon Championships 
 Queen's Club website
 ATP tournament profile

 
Aegon Championships
Queen's Club Championships
Aegon Championships
Aegon Championships
Aegon Championships